Bishop John Joseph Hogan  (May 10, 1829 – February 21, 1913)  was an Irish-born prelate of the Roman Catholic Church.  He served as the first Bishop of the Diocese of Saint Joseph in Missouri (1868 to 1880) and the first bishop of the Diocese of Kansas City in Missouri (1880 to 1913).

Biography
Hogan was born on May 10, 1829, in Bruff, County Limerick, Ireland, and immigrated to the United States in 1847.He settled in St. Louis, Missouri, where he attended seminary, and was ordained priest of the Archdiocese of Saint Louis on April 10, 1852.

Priesthood
After his ordination, Hogan served as a missionary to enslaved people in Potosi and Old Mines, Missouri in 1852 and 1853. He then became a pastor at Saint John Apostle and Evangelist Parish, then founded Saint Michael's Parish, both in St. Louis. In 1857, Hogan started a series of missions in outside St. Louis, ministering mainly to transient Irish railroad workers and Catholic settlers. He ministered primarily in Chillicothe, Macon City, Brookfield, Mexico, and Cameron, Missouri.  

In 1859, Hogan founded a settlement of Irish immigrants in southern Missouri, but it was wiped out during the American Civil War; this area is now called the Irish Wilderness. The northern Missouri missions suffered greatly during the war due to attacks of bushwackers. The public school system collapsed during the war, and Hogan set up a school for two years. 

After the war, Hogan was arrested for failing to take the Ironclad oath, a requirement of the Radical Missouri constitution of 1865; this provision was later declared unconstitutional by the Supreme Court of the United States.

Bishop of Saint Joseph
Hogan was appointed by Pope Pius IX as bishop of the newly erected Diocese of Saint Joseph on March 3, 1868.  He was consecrated bishop by Archbishop Peter Kenrick on September 13, 1868.

Bishop of Kansas City 
Hogan was appointed by Pope Leo XIII as bishop of the newly erected Diocese of Kansas City on September 10, 1880, while remaining apostolic administrator of the Diocese of Saint Joseph.  Hogan resigned from administration of Saint Joseph on June 19, 1893.

Death and legacy 
Hogan died in Kansas City, Missouri, on February 21, 1913.  He is buried in the center of Priest’s Circle at Mount St. Mary’s Cemetery.Bishop Hogan High School (now Hogan Preparatory Academy) in Kansas City, Missouri, and Bishop Hogan Memorial School in Chillicothe, Missouri, were named after Hogan.

References

External links
On the Mission in Missouri, 1857-1868 (autobiography)
Article on the Missouri Test Oath controversy
An article, John Joseph Hogan, Missionary Priest
http://www.geocities.com/bruffsite

19th-century Irish people
American Roman Catholic clergy of Irish descent
Roman Catholic Archdiocese of St. Louis
1829 births
1913 deaths
Clergy from County Limerick
Irish emigrants to the United States (before 1923)
Roman Catholic bishops of Saint Joseph
Roman Catholic bishops of Kansas City
19th-century Roman Catholic bishops in the United States
Clergy from St. Louis
People from Washington County, Missouri